Mulsantina picta (the painted lady beetle or pine lady beetle) is a species of ladybug belonging to the subfamily Coccinellinae.

Description
The elytral markings are quite variable, and sometimes absent. The pronotal markings are more constant and recognizable.

Distribution and habitat
Mulsantina picta is widespread across the United States and southern Canada.  It is especially associated with pine forests  and is an aphid and adelgid predator. Thus making M. picta a rather dominant species in older pine trees habitats (since they are conifer specialist), which are known to have low aphid densities.

References

External links
 Bugguide on Mulsantina Picta
 Description of new species of coleopterous insects inhabiting the state of Maine, by J. W. Randall

Coccinellidae
Beetles of North America
Beetles described in 1838
Taxa named by John Witt Randall